Allá lejos y hace tiempo may refer to:

 Back Long Ago, a 1969 Argentine film
 Far Away and Long Ago, a 1978 Argentine film